Glendale Veterans War Memorial also known as the Glendale USS Arizona Memorial (2002) is a monument to United States veterans of all wars.  It is located on the lawn in front of the Glendale Public Library at 5959 West Brown Street, Glendale, Arizona.  It was created by artist Joe Tyler with assistance from ceramist Scott Cisson and sculptor Sylvania Anderson.  The monument includes pieces of the USS Arizona, a battleship sunk at the Attack on Pearl Harbor, December 7, 1941.

See also
 USS Arizona salvaged artifacts
 USS Arizona Memorial

References

Attack on Pearl Harbor
Aftermath of World War II in the United States
USS Arizona
Monuments and memorials in Arizona
2002 sculptures
World War II memorials in the United States
2002 establishments in Arizona